The Jean Philippe Galband du Fort House is a historic house located on James Street in Cape Vincent, Jefferson County, New York.

Description and history 
Built in 1818, it is a -story, frame vernacular residence with Greek Revival detailing. It consists of two rectangular gabled blocks joined with a hyphen and a 1-story side wing on the north side. The south block contains a drawing room with a coffered ceiling inset with 24 original oil-on-canvas paintings, including those of George Washington and the Marquis de Lafayette. The drawing room also contains the original wallpaper, chandelier, fireplace, and mirror.

It was listed on the National Register of Historic Places on September 27, 1985.

References

Houses on the National Register of Historic Places in New York (state)
Greek Revival houses in New York (state)
Houses completed in 1818
Houses in Jefferson County, New York
National Register of Historic Places in Jefferson County, New York